Hannicap Circus is the debut solo studio album by American rapper Bizarre. It was released on June 28, 2005 via Sanctuary Urban. Production was handled by several record producers, including Hi-Tek, Mr. Porter, Eminem and Erick Sermon. It features guest appearances from D12, Young Miles, Big Boi, Devin the Dude, Dion Jenkins, Fatt Father, King Gordy, Obie Trice, Raphael Saadiq, stic.man, Sindee Syringe, and Torrey Holloway.

Hannicap Circus is a huge reflection of Bizarre's rap persona and stage presence and yet many of the songs carry important subject matter, a bit of Bizarre's past and talking about the state of hip-hop. The album peaked at number 48 on the Billboard 200, selling 21,000 copies for the first week. It spawned only one single: "Rockstar".

Critical reception

Hannicap Circus received mixed reviews from music critics who were less than enthusiastic with Bizarre's brand of humor and drama. At Metacritic, which assigns a normalized rating out of 100 reviews from mainstream critics the album received an average score of 44, based on 8 reviews.

AllMusic's David Jeffries praised the album for its beats and lyrical content that were more akin to a better produced Insane Clown Posse, calling it "solid, filthy, fun, and everything else that you'd want from a less nimble Kool Keith". Steve 'Flash' Juon of RapReviews found Bizarre's brand of demented shock humor entertaining and is complemented with appropriate production and a cast of equally game featured artists, concluding that "for fans of D12 and/or Hunter S. Thompson, Hannicap Circus is one crazy trip through the mind of a lunatic".

Usman Sajjid of The Situation felt that the material was hampered by the beats and lyricism lacking energy, concluding that "With a moderate effort from D12’s Bizarre, 'Hannicap Circus' may have just exceeded expectations of rap listeners not expecting a strong album". Dorian Lynskey of The Guardian said that the album had potential to be a competent horrorcore effort but was weighted down by Bizarre wanting it to be both humorous and dramatic with neither side fully delivering, concluding that "Hannicap Circus is the last thing you'd expect from a fat, shower-cap-wearing, nipple-rubbing son of a bitch: boring". Nathan Rabin of The A.V. Club heavily criticized Bizarre for his monotonous delivery over subject matter that fails to gain laughs, saying "anyone who doesn't find the topics of pedophilia, drug abuse, or incest innately hilarious will find Hannicap Circus rough going".

Soundtrack
"Gospel Weed Song" is featured during the credits of Harold & Kumar Escape from Guantanamo Bay.

Track listing
Credits adapted from Discogs.

Notes
 signifies an additional producer.
 signifies a co-producer.
On the edited version, all skits were cut and it left only 17 tracks. Also all profanity was blanked on the edited version with the exception of "Fuck Your Life", which allegedly contained backmasking.
Dion provides additional vocals on tracks 7 and 18.
Mr. Porter provides additional vocals on track 12.
Shaphan "MAESTRO" Williams provides additional vocals on track 13.

Charts

References

External links

2005 debut albums
Bizarre (rapper) albums
Albums produced by Eminem
Albums produced by Hi-Tek
Albums produced by Mr. Porter
Albums produced by Erick Sermon
Albums produced by Raphael Saadiq